Sweetwater was an American rock band originally from Los Angeles, California. They were the act scheduled to open the Woodstock festival in 1969 but were stuck in traffic, so that folksinger Richie Havens's trio instead performed first. Sweetwater was eventually flown in to Woodstock by helicopter and performed next, becoming the first band to perform at the festival.

History  
The original members of the band were Nancy "Nansi" Nevins (lead vocals/guitar), August Burns (cello), Albert Moore (flute/backing vocals), Alan Malarowitz (drums), Elpidio Cobian (conga), Alex Del Zoppo (keyboards) and Fred Herrera (bass).

The band originally formed to perform in local coffee houses in Los Angeles until being signed to a major label. Sweetwater were early developers of the psychedelic rock/folk rock fusion style that was popularized by Jefferson Airplane to be regarded as the archetypical "60s Sound". In 1968–69, the band often toured with The Doors. They were also one of the opening acts for The Animals in 1968. One of their best-known recordings is a version of the traditional folk song "Sometimes I Feel Like a Motherless Child". It appeared on their debut album, Sweetwater, the band's only album to chart nationally in the U.S. As the band progressed, they developed music more toward the psychedelic folk genre.

Three days after Sweetwater performed on The Red Skelton Show, Dec. 30, 1969, singer Nansi Nevins was severely injured when the car she was traveling in was struck by a drunk driver. She suffered a brain injury which left her in a coma for 10 days, and she suffered damage to one of her vocal cords as a result of the tracheotomy performed to save her life. Nansi would never again complete a full album with the band, although she still had some recordings prepared for the next two albums. For several years, there was a widespread but unfounded belief that Beverly Bivens, formerly of the West Coast group We Five, had died in a car accident. It is thought that confusion over names (Bivens/Nevins) may have contributed to this rumor.

The group reunited for Woodstock '94 in 1994 with three original members - Nevins, Herrera and Del Zoppo. August Burns died after contracting pneumonia while being treated in a German hospital for injuries he suffered after falling out of a construction elevator in 1979, Alan Malarowitz was killed in a car crash in 1981, Albert Moore died of lung cancer in 1994. Elpidio Cobian works as an underwater welder in the movie industry.

In 1999, the band's story was depicted in a VH1 TV-movie Sweetwater: A True Rock Story. Amy Jo Johnson portrayed Nansi Nevins and Michelle Phillips portrayed the older Nancy.

Discography

Sweetwater discography
Sweetwater (1968)
Just for You (1970)
Melon (1971)
Cycles: The Reprise Collection (1999) - (Individually numbered limited edition of 10,000 copies)
Live At Last (2002)

Nancy Nevins' solo discography
Nancy Nevins (1975)

References

External links
Official Sweetwater Website
Official Alex Del Zoppo Website
Sweetwater album at Collector's Choice Music
Sweetwater: A True Rock Story at Internet Movie Database

Rock music groups from California
Musical groups from Los Angeles
Musical groups established in 1968